Johnny Broers (born 9 April 1959) is a Dutch former professional racing cyclist. He rode in two editions of the Tour de France.

References

External links

1959 births
Living people
Dutch male cyclists
People from De Bilt
Cyclists from Utrecht (province)
20th-century Dutch people